Center:Level:Roar is an album recorded in 2003 by the Youngblood Brass Band.

Track listing 
 "To Come Together"
 "Round One"
 "Culture:Envy:War"
 "Brooklyn"
 "Diaspora"
 "Human Nature, Part 2"
 "Thursday"
 "The Movement"
 "Avalanche"
 "Nate Mccarish Handbills for No Man"
 "Camouflage"
 "Is an Elegy"
 "Under Your Influence"
 "V.I.P."
 "And Leave Alone"

References

Youngblood Brass Band albums
2003 albums